Kanaka Durga Temple is a Hindu Temple dedicated to Goddess Kanaka Durga. The deity in this temple is also popularly referred as Kanaka Durga. The temple is located in Vijayawada, Andhra Pradesh, India on the Indrakeeladri Hills on the banks of Krishna River. Kaalika Purana, Durgaa Sapthashati and other Vedic literature have mentioned about Goddess Kanaka Durga on the Indrakeelaadri and have described the deity as Swayambhu, (self-manifested) in Triteeya Kalpa.

Goddess legend

The popular legend is about the triumph of Goddess Kanaka Durga also popularly known as Kanaka Mahalakshmi over the demon King Mahishasura. It is said that the growing menace of demons became unbearable for the natives.  Sage Indrakila practiced severe penance, and when the goddess appeared the sage pleaded to Her to reside on his head and keep a vigil on the wicked demons.  As per his wishes of killing the demons, Goddess Durga made Indrakila Her permanent abode.  Later, She also slayed the demon king Mahishasura freeing the people of Vijayawada from evil.

At the Kanakadurga temple, the enchanting  icon of the deity is bedecked in glittering ornaments and bright flowers.  Her icon here depicts Her eight-armed form -each holding a powerful weapon- in a standing posture over the demon Mahishashura and piercing him with Her trident. The goddess is the epitome of beauty.

Worship
Kanaka Durga Temple is synonymous with Vijayawada. It is mentioned in the sacred texts.

It is mentioned in the Hindu scriptures that the deity in the Kanakadurga temple is regarded as 'Swayambhu' or self-manifested, hence considered very powerful.

Kanaka Durga worshipped in the temple is Mahalakshmi form of Lakshmi Durga. All the poojas related to Lakshmi devi are performed in the temple. During the month of Shraavana, Varalakshmi Vratam is performed on all Fridays with special reverence. More than 20,000 people attends the celebrations during this month. Special pujas are performed during Dasara also called Navaratri. The festival of Dasara is celebrated here in this temple every year. The deity worshipped in the temple is Mahalakshmi. A large number of pilgrims attend the colourful celebrations and take a holy dip in the Krishna river.

Inscriptions of different dynasties are found in the temple.

Transport

Located in the heart of Vijayawada city, the temple is just a 10 minutes drive from the railway station and Bus stand and about 20 km from airport. Temple buses are available at bus stand and railway station for every 20 minutes. Vijayawada is located 275 kilometers from Hyderabad. It is well connected by road, rail and air from all parts of the country.

Sakambhari festival
The annual Goddess Sakambhari festival is celebrated in Ashadha month with deep piety and ceremonies. During the three-day-long festival goddess, Kanaka Durga assumes the form of Sakambhari or Banasankari Amma of the Banashankari Amma Temple, wherein prayers are offered to the Goddess to bless all vegetables, agriculture, and food so that they are plentiful and capable of nourishing the multitude. Sakambari festival is from 25 July to 27 July in 2018, as it is celebrated from Sukla Paksha Thrayodashi to Purnima, of Ashadha month every year. Goddess Sakambhari temple is situated in Shivalik Mountain range near to Saharanpur Uttar in Pardesh.

See also
 Banalinga
 Banashankari Amma Temple

External links

References

Devi temples in Andhra Pradesh
Hindu temples in Krishna district
Durga temples
Religious buildings and structures in Vijayawada
Tourist attractions in Vijayawada